The PWS-50,(PWS - Podlaska Wytwórnia Samolotów - Podlasie Aircraft Factory), was a prototype Polish single-engine mid-wing monoplane sports aircraft of 1930, constructed by Podlaska Wytwórnia Samolotów.

Design and development
The aircraft was designed in 1929 in Podlaska Wytwórnia Samolotów, on factory's initiative, specially to participate in the Challenge International de Tourisme 1930 international touring aircraft contest. A preliminary design was made by Major Wacław Makowski, a construction sketches by Augustyn Bobek-Zdaniewski. The plane was built and first flown in spring of 1930 by Franciszek Rutkowski in Biała Podlaska.

Operational history
The prototype, with markings SP-ADB, took part in the Challenge 1930 international contest in July 1930, flown by Zbigniew Babiński. He was disqualified for time infringement, but completed the rally off the contest.

Later the plane was used for a short time by an Aviation Club of the PWS factory. It took part in some competitions in Poland, without much success, only in June 1933 J. Szałowski won the 3rd place in PWS-50 in the 1st Flight of North-Western Poland. During a contest in autumn 1930 the plane was damaged and later repaired. In 1932 the plane received a name "Podlasianka" (a female of Podlasie region). In late June 1933 the plane was damaged in a crash in Warsaw, and then was broken up.

Description
It was a single-engine cantilever mid-wing monoplane, of a wooden construction. A fuselage was rectangular in cross-section, covered with plywood. Trapezoid single-section wings with rounded tips, two-spar, plywood and canvas covered. Crew of two, sitting side-by-side between spars, in an open cockpit, fitted with a windshield and dual controls. A luggage compartment was behind the cockpit. The plane had a fixed conventional landing gear, with a rear skid. The Flight described the PWS-50 as: the view appeared very good and the construction sound.

The engine was 4-cylinder air-cooled straight Cirrus III in front, 85 hp nominal power and 94 hp take-off power. Two-blade wooden propeller  of a fixed pitch. A fuel tank behind a cockpit had a capacity 100 L and could be dropped in emergency. Fuel consumption was 26 L/hour.

Specifications

References

Further reading

External links

Photos and drawings at Ugolok Neba

1930s Polish sport aircraft
PWS aircraft
Single-engined tractor aircraft
Mid-wing aircraft
Aircraft first flown in 1930